The Northern Ireland Textile Workers' Union was a trade union in the United Kingdom. It merged with the Transport and General Workers' Union in 1930.

See also

 List of trade unions
 Transport and General Workers' Union
 TGWU amalgamations

References
Arthur Ivor Marsh. Concise encyclopedia of industrial relations. Gower Press, Dec 1, 1979 pg. 316

Defunct trade unions of Ireland
Textile and clothing trade unions
Trade unions in Northern Ireland
Transport and General Workers' Union amalgamations
Trade unions disestablished in 1930